End of Grey is the debut album of the Christian rock band Decyfer Down and the only album to feature lead vocalist Caleb Oliver. It was released on June 6, 2006, and has four singles ("Fight Like This," "Burn Back the Sun," "No Longer" and "Life Again"), all of which reached No. 1 on the Christian rock chart. The album peaked at No. 43 on the Top Christian Albums.

Track listing

Singles
"Fight Like This"
"Burn Back the Sun"
"No Longer"
"Life Again"

Music videos
Only one music video has been released for the album. The video for "Fight Like This" was released on YouTube on September 4, 2007, by their record label, INO Records. As of January 2019, the music video had achieved over 271,000 views on YouTube.

Personnel 
 Caleb Oliver - lead vocals, backing vocals, bass guitar
 Brandon Mills - lead guitars, rhythm guitars, backing vocals, synth (co-lead on "I'll Breathe for You")
 Christopher Clonts - lead guitars, rhythm guitars, backing vocals
 Josh Oliver - drums, percussion

References

Decyfer Down albums
2006 debut albums